"In 100 Years..." is a song by German pop group Modern Talking. It was released on 9 November 1987 on Ariola. The track is the only single from the band's sixth album, In the Garden of Venus. It was the duo's final release before their split later that year.

The song is about a person who believes that the current lack of empathy and understanding may lead to a dystopian future in which feelings, including love, are illegal, and in which expressions of romance and humanity will be only a distant memory.

Track listing
12" Maxi Hansa 609 543 year 1987
"In 100 Years..." (Long Version - Future Mix) - 6:39
"In 100 Years..." (Part I) - 3:58
"In 100 Years..." (Part II) - 4:06

7" Single Hansa 109 543 year 1987
"In 100 Years..." (Part 1) - 3:58
"In 100 Years..." (Part 2) - 4:06

Charts

References

External links

1987 singles
Modern Talking songs
Songs written by Dieter Bohlen
1987 songs
Ariola Records singles